David Robert Osborne (29 September 1879 – 1954) was an English first-class cricketer active 1905–14 who played for Middlesex, Marylebone Cricket Club (MCC) and Cambridge University. He was born in Perth, Western Australia; died in the Bahamas.

References

1879 births
1954 deaths
English cricketers
Middlesex cricketers
Marylebone Cricket Club cricketers
Cambridge University cricketers
Buckinghamshire cricketers
Date of death missing